Miguel Ortiz-Cañavate Ozeki (born 19 February 1991) is a Spanish swimmer. He competed in the men's 4 × 100 metre freestyle relay event at the 2016 Summer Olympics.

References

External links
 

1991 births
Living people
Spanish male backstroke swimmers
Spanish male butterfly swimmers
Olympic swimmers of Spain
Swimmers at the 2016 Summer Olympics
Place of birth missing (living people)
Spanish male freestyle swimmers
Michigan Wolverines men's swimmers